This is an episode list for the science fiction, action/adventure television series Swamp Thing. The series is based on the Vertigo Comics character the Swamp Thing and reprises Dick Durock as the title character. Originally airing on USA Network, the series ran from 1990 to 1993 with a total of three seasons. It was planned to run for 100 episodes but ended prematurely after 72.

In 2008, Shout! Factory released DVD collections of Swamp Thing episodes in their proper chronological order. The following list, however, lists them as they originally aired on USA Network.



Series overview

Episodes

Season 1 (1990–91)

Season 2 (1992)

Season 3 (1992–93)

External links
 

Lists of American science fiction television series episodes
Lists of American fantasy television series episodes
Swamp Thing (1990 TV series)
Lists of DC Comics television series episodes